Fabiano Lima Rodrigues (born 27 June 1979), known as Fabiano, is a Brazilian footballer who played as a left-wingback.

Biography

Genoa
Fabiano was signed by Genoa in August 2006. He won Serie A promotion in June 2007 by finished 3rd in Serie B with team.

In August 2008, he was loaned to LA Galaxy.

On 4 August 2009, he was loaned to Vicenza. But in January 2010 he returned to Genoa.

Guava
In April 2010, he signed a contract until the end of year 2010 with Guava.

Honours
Campeonato Brasileiro Série A: 2001
Süper Lig: 2005
Campeonato Paranaense: 2001, 2002

References

External links

aic.football.it

1979 births
Living people
Footballers from São Paulo (state)
Brazilian footballers
Brazilian expatriate footballers
Club Athletico Paranaense players
São Paulo FC players
A.C. Perugia Calcio players
Fenerbahçe S.K. footballers
Sociedade Esportiva Palmeiras players
S.S. Arezzo players
Genoa C.F.C. players
RC Celta de Vigo players
L.R. Vicenza players
Guarani FC players
Criciúma Esporte Clube players
Campeonato Brasileiro Série A players
Serie A players
Serie B players
Süper Lig players
Expatriate footballers in Italy
Expatriate footballers in Turkey
Expatriate footballers in Spain
Brazilian expatriate sportspeople in Italy
Brazilian expatriate sportspeople in Turkey
Brazilian expatriate sportspeople in Spain
Association football fullbacks